Richard Bryn Williams, or Bryn Williams (1902–1981), was a Welsh writer, poet, playwright and historian. From 1975 to 1978 he was Archdruid of the National Eisteddfod of Wales.

Biography 
Williams was born in Blaenau Ffestiniog, Gwynedd, Wales.  When he was seven years old, his family moved to Trelew, Chubut, Patagonia, Argentina. He returned to Wales in 1923 and studied at the University College of North Wales (now Bangor University). He became an expert on Patagonian history and was a major contributor to the province's literature.

He was a supporter of the National Eisteddfod, as well as competing in the cultural festival itself, and won the chair both in 1964 and 1968, and from 1975 to 1978 he was archdruid, using the bardic name Bryn. Almost all of his numerous works reflect the life of Patagonia and its history.

Literary work 
Children's books
Straeon Patagonia (Tales of Patagonia) (1944)
Y March Coch (The Red Steed) (1954)
Bandit yr Andes (The Andean Bandit) (1956)
Croesi'r Paith (Crossing the Steppe) (1958)
Yn Nwylo'r Eirth (In the Hands of Bears) (1967)
Y Rebel (The Rebel) (1969)
Agar (1973)
Y Gwylliaid (The Bandits) (1976)

Poetry
Pentewynion (Brands) (1949)
Patagonia (1965)
O'r Tir Pell (From the Far Land) (1972)

Plays
Pedrito (1947)
Cariad Creulon (Cruel Love) (1970)
Dafydd Dywysog (Prince David) (1975)

Histories, studies and other books
Cymry Patagonia (The Welsh of Patagonia) (1942)
Eluned Morgan: bywgraffiad a detholiad (Eluned Morgan: Biography and selection) (1945)
Y Wladfa (The Colony) (1962)
Gwladfa Patagonia 1865–1965 (The Colony of Patagonia) (1965)
Atgofion o Batagonia (Memories of Patagonia) (1980)
Crwydro Patagonia (Exploring Patagonia) (1960). (Guidebook)
Taith i Sbaen (Trip to Spain) (1949). (Travel book)
Teithiau Tramor (Foreign trips) (1970). (Travel book)
Prydydd y Paith (1983). (Memoirs, published after his death)

References 

1902 births
1981 deaths
People from Blaenau Ffestiniog
Welsh Eisteddfod archdruids
Welsh emigrants to Argentina
Welsh-speaking academics
Welsh-language poets
20th-century Welsh historians
Argentine male writers
Welsh-language writers
Welsh children's writers
People from Merionethshire
20th-century Welsh poets
20th-century Welsh dramatists and playwrights
Welsh male poets
British male dramatists and playwrights
20th-century British male writers